Dies rigorose Leben is a 1983 West German drama film directed by Vadim Glowna. It was entered into the 33rd Berlin International Film Festival, where it won an Honourable Mention.

Cast
 Ángela Molina as Rosa
 Jerzy Radziwilowicz as Joey
 Vera Tschechowa as Salka
 Viveca Lindfors as Ada
 Elfriede Kuzmany as Martha
 José Sierra as George Lone Tree
 Frederico Rodrigues as Johnny
 Dolores Davis as Lorraine
 Beth Gottlieb as Juicy Lucy
 Helen Pesante as Ruby
 Laura Acosta as Boobs
 Lee Garcia as Pearl
 Joseph Pickett as Fremder
 Mike Gaglio Sr. as Defense lawyer

References

External links

1983 films
1983 drama films
West German films
1980s German-language films
German drama films
Films directed by Vadim Glowna
Films set in the United States
1980s German films